The women's 80 metres hurdles at the 1946 European Athletics Championships was held in Oslo, Norway, at Bislett Stadion on 23 August 1946.

Medalists

Results

Final
23 August

Heats
23 August

Heat 1

Heat 2

Participation
According to an unofficial count, 10 athletes from 7 countries participated in the event.

 (1)
 (1)
 (1)
 (2)
 (1)
 (2)
 (2)

References

80 metres hurdles
Sprint hurdles at the European Athletics Championships
Euro